Metzneria intestinella is a moth of the family Gelechiidae. It is found in most of southern Europe.

References

Moths described in 1864
Metzneria
Moths of Europe
Insects of Turkey